Auchinleish is a village in Angus, Scotland.

References

Villages in Angus, Scotland